Rock My World may refer to:
Rock My World (album), a 2008 album by Bret Michaels
"Rock My World" (Five Star song), a 1988 song by Five Star
"Rock My World (Little Country Girl)", a 1993 song by Brooks & Dunn
"Rock My World", a 2002 song by Lee Kernaghan from the album Electric Rodeo
Rock My World, U.S. title for the 2002 film Global Heresy
Rock My World, Inc., a San Diego technology company which owns RockMyRun, a mobile running/workout app
"You Rock My World", a 2001 song by Michael Jackson